Crumb or Crumbs may refer to:

Crumb
 Crumb (film), a 1994 documentary about cartoonist Robert Crumb
 Crumb (surname)
 Crumb (unit), a unit of information consisting of two bits
 Crumb (band), an American indie band

Crumbs 
 Crumbs (TV series), a 2006 television series
 Crumbs (film), a 2015 Ethiopian post-apocalyptic science fiction romance film
 Bread crumbs, particles of bread
 The Crumbs, an American rock band
 "Crumbs", a song by Ministry from their 1996 album Filth Pig
 "Crumbs", a song by Rebecca Black from Let Her Burn
 CRUMBS, a theatrical act
 Crumbs Bake Shop, a New York City bakery founded in 2003

See also
 The Cartier Project, a 1987 novel by Miha Mazzini, first published in Slovenia as Drobtinice ("Crumbs")
 Breadcrumb (disambiguation)
 
 
 Crumble (disambiguation)
 Crumbling (disambiguation)